PRZ may refer to:
Power Rangers Zeo, a US superhero action television series
Prineville Airport in Prineville, Oregon (IATA code)
Air_Paradise_International - airline based in Denpasar, Bali, Indonesia.(ICAO code)
prz - the ISO 639.3 language code for a unique sign language used by Providence Island inhabitants
Portales Municipal Airport in Portales, New Mexico (IATA location identifier)